DTDP-3-amino-3,6-dideoxy-alpha-D-galactopyranose transaminase (dTDP-6-deoxy-D-xylohex-3-uloseaminase, FdtB, TDP-3-keto-6-deoxy-D-galactose-3-aminotransferase, RavAMT, TDP-3-keto-6-deoxy-D-galactose 3-aminotransferase, TDP-3-dehydro-6-deoxy-D-galactose 3-aminotransferase) is an enzyme with systematic name dTDP-3-amino-3,6-dideoxy-alpha-D-galactopyranose:2-oxoglutarate aminotransferase. This enzyme catalyses the following chemical reaction

 dTDP-3-amino-3,6-dideoxy-alpha-D-galactopyranose + 2-oxoglutarate  dTDP-3-dehydro-6-deoxy-alpha-D-galactopyranose + L-glutamate

This enzyme is a pyridoxal-phosphate protein.

References

External links 
 

EC 2.6.1